Maly Zhemchug is a rural locality (a settlement) in Tunkinsky District, Republic of Buryatia, Russia. The population was 55 as of 2010. There is 1 street.

Geography 
Maly Zhemchug is located 17 km east of Kyren (the district's administrative centre) by road. Okhor-Shibir is the nearest rural locality.

References 

Rural localities in Tunkinsky District